Fritz-kola (stylized as fritz-kola) is a soft drink made in north Germany and shipped to many nations in the European Union. It has a relatively high caffeine content and is sold in glass bottles with labels which were originally black and white, using the faces of the two founders in the logo.

History
Two students from Hamburg, Lorenz Hampl and Mirco Wiegert, started selling Fritz-kola in 2003. They had a brewery help them develop a cola recipe, choosing to use less sugar and more caffeine (25mg of caffeine per 100ml) than Coke or Pepsi, and adding lemon flavour. They polled people outside a shopping centre to choose the company name. To save money, they used black and white labels and a photoshopped version of pictures of their heads as a logo; they sold the first crates to bars on a returnable basis, and did not establish an office for three years.

Hampl left the business in 2016. , Wiegert heads the company and owns two-thirds of it. The company employs 280 people. Five bottling plants produce the cola, which is sold in a number of European countries; in 2019 its 330ml bottles outsold all brands except Coke, and its other major markets are the Netherlands, Poland, Belgium, and Austria. Sales in 2015 were €7.4 million.

Varieties

Through the years Fritz-kola has offered many variants of its cola as well as different kinds of soft drinks, including:

Fritz-kola:
Fritz-kola
Fritz-kola kola-coffee-lemonade
Fritz-kola sugarfree
Fritz-limo:
Fritz-limo orangeade
Fritz-limo melon
Fritz-limo lemonade
Fritz-limo apple, cherry and elderberry
mischmasch kola-orange-lemonade
Fritz-spritz:
Fritz-spritz organic cloudy sparkling apple
Fritz-spritz organic sparkling grape
Fritz-spritz organic sparkling rhubarb
fritz-mate (discontinued)

See also
 Craft soda

References

Cola brands
German brands
German drinks
Soft drinks